145th Aviation Regiment is an aviation regiment of the United States Army. It was previously the 145th Combat Aviation Battalion which was operational during the Vietnam War under the control of the 12th Combat Aviation Group.

History
 HQ & HQ Company at Bien Hoa from sometime between November 1966 and January 1967
 145th Security Platoon at Bien Hoa from sometime between November 1966 and January 1967
 87th Quartermaster Detachment (PETRL) at Bien Hoa from sometime between November 1966 and January 1967
 68th Assault Helicopter Company at Bien Hoa from 17 July 1966
 391st Transportation Detachment (KD) at Bien Hoa from sometime between November 1966 and January 1967
 282nd Signal Detachment (RL) at Bien Hoa from sometime between November 1966 and January 1967
 430th Medical Detachment (OA) at Bien Hoa from sometime between November 1966 and January 1967
 117th Assault Helicopter Company at Bien Hoa from 1 January 1968 until sometime between February 1970 and April 1970
 140th Transportation Detachment (KD) at Bien Hoa from 1 January 1968
 256th Signal Detachment (RL) at Bien Hoa from 1 January 1968
 118th Assault Helicopter Company at Bien Hoa
 573rd Transportation Detachment (KD) at Bien Hoa
 198th Signal Detachment (RL) at Bien Hoa
 190th Assault Helicopter Company at Bien Hoa from 8 September 1967
 605th Transportation Detachment (KD) at Bien Hoa from 1967
 520th Medical Detachment (OA) at Bien Hoa from 1967
 334th Aviation Company (Armed)/(Assault Helicopter)/(Aerial Weapons Company) at Bien Hoa from sometime between February and April 1967
 571st Transportation Detachment (KD) at Bien Hoa
 320th Signal Detachment (RL) at Phu Loi

Current structure
 1st Battalion
 A Company
 B Company
 D Company

References

Military units and formations in Alabama
145